Castel di Sangro (locally Caštiéllë) is a city and comune of 6,461 people (as of 2013) in the Province of L'Aquila, in Abruzzo, Central Italy. It is the main city of the Alto Sangro e Altopiano delle Cinque Miglia area.

Geography
Castel di Sangro is located near the Sangro River, in a valley in the Apennine Mountains.

Neighbouring towns include Roccaraso, Pescocostanzo, Rivisondoli, San Pietro Avellana and Montenero Val Cocchiara.

History
Castel di Sangro was known to the Romans as Aufidena (a city of the Samnites).  It is the ancestral home of the third and last line of the House of Caesar (Catulus Caesar).

In the Second World War, the city was liberated by the West Nova Scotia Regiment of the First Canadian Division in November 1943. The regiment launched a night attack against the hilltop monastery which overlooks the city on November 22 but had to withdraw after suffering heavy losses from machine gun positions of the 3rd Battalion of the German 1st Parachute Regiment. The Canadians attacked a second time on November 24 supported by a heavy artillery bombardment which forced the Germans to withdraw, allowing the regiment to occupy the monastery without losses bringing Castel di Sangro and the south bank of the Sangro River into Allied hands.<ref>G. W. L. NICHOLSON, "The Upper Sangro", OFFICIAL HISTORY, OF THE CANADIAN ARMY IN THE SECOND WORLD WAR, Volume II, THE CANADIANS IN ITALY 1943-1945, p. 284-285</ref>

 Main sights
 Basilica di Santa Maria Assunta
 Museo civico aufidenate

 Sport 
The town gained some popularity in the mid-1990s thanks to the exploits of local football club Castel di Sangro Calcio In 1996, Castel di Sangro was visited by American author Joe McGinniss who wrote The Miracle of Castel di Sangro'', a book about the team that made it up through 5 leagues to get to Serie B, the second-highest league in Italian football. The club now plays at Abruzzo's Promozione level, five levels below Serie B.

Districts 
Castel di Sangro is divided into six districts:
 Civita
 Stazione 
 Colle
 Codacchiola 
 Ara
 Piazza

Transportation
Castel di Sangro has for years been a transit point for many people, because of its location making it the gateway into Abruzzo.

Roads

The main roads are:
 The Sangro Valley road, a highway connecting Castel di Sangro with the Val di Sangro, and then with the Adriatic Sea. The same road continues for a long stretch southward and is used by thousands of tourists who come from areas of Campania and other regions of southern Italy.
 The SS 17, a fast road connecting L'Aquila to Foggia. This road is very busy, with both local and through traffic. Its true capacity is often exceeded and it has seen a large number of accidents, some fatal. It is, however, generally well-managed, remaining open throughout the winter, despite the high altitude of the route.
 The Isernia - Castel di Sangro highway. Completed in 2011, this road halved the driving time from the Alto Molise to the Alto Sangro.

Sister city

  Kentville, Nova Scotia, Canada, in honour of the city's liberation in 1943 by the West Nova Scotia Regiment based at Kentville.

References

External links
 Official website 
 Castel di Sangro 1 Scout Group official website